Swagger Creek is a stream in Clackamas County, Oregon, in the United States. It is a tributary of Clear Creek.

See also
List of rivers of Oregon

References

Rivers of Clackamas County, Oregon
Rivers of Oregon